Guillermo Muñoz (born 15 November 1964) is a Mexican table tennis player. He competed in the men's singles event at the 1996 Summer Olympics.

References

1964 births
Living people
Mexican male table tennis players
Olympic table tennis players of Mexico
Table tennis players at the 1996 Summer Olympics
Sportspeople from Mexico City
Pan American Games medalists in table tennis
Pan American Games bronze medalists for Mexico
Table tennis players at the 2011 Pan American Games
Medalists at the 2011 Pan American Games